Belcher or Belsher, is a village in the Yrgyz District, Aktobe Region, Kazakhstan. It is part of the Nura Rural District, with (KATO code - 153441100). Population:

Geography
The village is located by the northeastern lakeshore of Baitakkol, the largest lake in the area.

See also
Lakes of the lower Turgay and Irgiz

References

Populated places in Aktobe Region